Calliostoma caroli is a species of sea snail, a marine gastropod mollusk in the family Calliostomatidae.

Description

Distribution
This species occurs in the Atlantic Ocean off the Azores.

References

External links

caroli
Gastropods described in 1927